Luboš Lom (3 February 1965 – 26 February 2022) was a Czech cyclist. He competed in two events at the 1988 Summer Olympics.

References

External links
 

1965 births
2022 deaths
Czech male cyclists
Olympic cyclists of Czechoslovakia
Cyclists at the 1988 Summer Olympics
Sportspeople from Kladno